Planaxis sulcatus, common name the tropical periwinkle, is a species of sea snail, a marine gastropod mollusk in the family Planaxidae.

Distribution
This marine species occurs in the Red Sea and in the Indian Ocean off Mozambique, Kenya, Madagascar, Tanzania and off Mauritius, Chagos, Aldabra and the Mascarene Basin. It is also found off the Pakistani coast, specially Sonmiani Bay (Miani hor).

Description
The size of the shell varies between 13 mm and 35 mm.

Ecology
Parasites of Planaxis sulcatus include trematode Lobatostoma manteri.

References

 Tan S.K. & Low M.E.Y. (2014) Singapore Mollusca: 5. The subfamily Planaxinae (Gastropoda: Caenogastropoda: Cerithioidea: Planaxidae). Nature in Singapore 7: 15-23
 Hasegawa K. (2017). Family Planaxidae. Pp. 794-795, in: T. Okutani (ed.), Marine Mollusks in Japan, ed. 2. 2 vols. Tokai University Press. 1375 pp.
 Drivas, J. & Jay, M. (1987). Coquillages de La Réunion et de l'Île Maurice. Collection Les Beautés de la Nature. Delachaux et Niestlé: Neuchâtel. ISBN 2-603-00654-1. 159 pp
 Steyn, D.G. & Lussi, M. (1998) Marine Shells of South Africa. An Illustrated Collector's Guide to Beached Shells. Ekogilde Publishers, Hartebeespoort, South Africa, ii + 264 pp.
 Rosenberg, G. 1992. Encyclopedia of Seashells. Dorset: New York. 224 pp.

External links
  Born, I. Von. (1778). Index rerum naturalium Musei Cæsarei Vindobonensis. Pars I.ma. Testacea. Verzeichniß der natürlichen Seltenheiten des k. k. Naturalien Cabinets zu Wien. Erster Theil. Schalthiere.
 Gmelin J.F. (1791). Vermes. In: Gmelin J.F. (Ed.) Caroli a Linnaei Systema Naturae per Regna Tria Naturae, Ed. 13. Tome 1(6). G.E. Beer, Lipsiae 
 Lamarck, (J.-B. M) de. (1822). Histoire naturelle des animaux sans vertèbres. Tome septième. Paris: published by the Author, 711 pp]
 Deshayes, G. P. (1828). Planaxe. Planaxis. pp. 12-13. In: J. Bory de Saint-Vincent (ed.), Dictionnaire classique d'histoire naturelle, vol. 14. Rey & Gravier, and Baudouin frères, Paris.
 Quoy, J. R. C. & Gaimard, J. P. (1832-1835). Voyage de la corvette l'Astrolabe : exécuté par ordre du roi, pendant les années 1826-1827-1828-1829, sous le commandement de M. J. Dumont d'Urville. Zoologie
  Adams, A. (1853). Descriptions of several new species of Murex, Rissoina, Planaxis, and Eulima, from the Cumingian collection. Proceedings of the Zoological Society of London. 19: 267-272. 
 Dunker, W. (1861). Beschreibung neuer Mollusken. Malakozoologische Blätter. 8 (2): 35-45.
 Wiggering, B.; Neiber, M. T.; Gebauer, K.; Glaubrecht, M. (2020). One species, two developmental modes: a case of geographic poecilogony in marine gastropods. BMC Evolutionary Biology. 20(1)
 

Planaxidae
Gastropods described in 1791